William Alpheus Higgs (c. 183823 December 1889) was a London tea merchant who served as sheriff of London and Middlesex in 1887. He was a liveryman of several of the city's guilds and at the time of his death had been selected as a Radical candidate for a parliamentary constituency in north London.

Early life and family
William Alpheus Higgs was born around 1838 or 1839 in Luckington, Wiltshire. He married Phoebe and the 1881 census shows them living in St Pancras, London, with their eight sons and two daughters.

Career

Higgs was a partner in Barber & Company, tea merchants of London, Liverpool, Manchester, and Bristol. He also traded as William Alpheus Higgs & Company, tea, wine, and spirits importers and grocers with multiple premises in London. He was a liveryman of several of the city's guilds and in June 1887 was elected as a sheriff of London and Middlesex.

In the late 19th century he bought Willenhall House in Pricklers Hill, north London, from T. G. Waterhouse, and at the time of his death had been selected as a Radical candidate for a parliamentary constituency in the area.

Death and legacy

Higgs died of apoplexy at midnight on the 23 December 1889 at the Hotel Victoria in London where he was about to set off with his wife and sons for the Lady Mayoress's ball. In 1907 his arms were carried by the Worshipful Company of Glovers in the procession of the Lord Mayor's Show. He was buried on the western side of Highgate Cemetery.

References 

Sheriffs of the City of London
English merchants
People from Wiltshire
1830s births
Year of birth uncertain
1889 deaths
Burials at Highgate Cemetery
19th-century English businesspeople